Grod jul på Näsbrännan ("Froggy Christmas at Näsbrännan") was the 1993 edition of Sveriges Radio's Christmas Calendar. It was also released as a book in 1993.

Plot
Näsbränna farm in Nästäppa Parish is deserted since the child of the last farmer living there self became adult, moving into town. But there are still "tomtar" living there.

Audiobook
Writer Katarina Mazetti also recorded the story as an audiobook, releasing it to CD in 2005.

References

1993 radio programme debuts
1993 radio programme endings
Sveriges Radio's Christmas Calendar